Remetalk Point is  a point on the east coast of the Ioannes Paulus II Peninsula, Livingston Island in the South Shetland Islands, Antarctica formed by an offshoot of Oryahovo Heights.  It separates the glacier termini of Medven Glacier to the north and Berkovitsa Glacier to the south.

The point is named after the 1st century AD Thracian king Remetalk III (Rhoemetalces III).

Location

Map
 L.L. Ivanov. Antarctica: Livingston Island and Greenwich, Robert, Snow and Smith Islands. Scale 1:120000 topographic map.  Troyan: Manfred Wörner Foundation, 2009.  
 Antarctic Digital Database (ADD). Scale 1:250000 topographic map of Antarctica. Scientific Committee on Antarctic Research (SCAR). Since 1993, regularly upgraded and updated.
 L.L. Ivanov. Antarctica: Livingston Island and Smith Island. Scale 1:100000 topographic map. Manfred Wörner Foundation, 2017.

External links
 Remetalk Point. SCAR Composite Antarctic Gazetteer
 Bulgarian Antarctic Gazetteer. Antarctic Place-names Commission. (details in Bulgarian, basic data in English)

External links
 Remetalk Point. Copernix satellite image

Headlands of Livingston Island